Marciano Antonio "Mark" Reyes V is a Filipino film director, television director, music video director and film writer known for his multi-stranded storylines. He is a resident director and writer of GMA Network.

His work include the film Moments of Love and television series Encantadia, which have both won several awards from various festivals including the New York TV & Film Festival. He is the uncle of the Kapuso actress, Krystal Reyes and the nephew of veteran film and television director and writer Jose Javier Reyes.

Filmography

Television
 TBA Voltes V: Legacy
 2022 Agimat ng Agila (Book 2)
 2019–2020 Beautiful Justice
 2019 Inagaw na Bituin
 2018–2019 Cain at Abel 
 2018 The Cure
 2017-2018 My Korean Jagiya
 2016–2017 Encantadia
 2016–2019 Sunday PinaSaya
 2015–2016 Because of You
 2014–2016 The Half Sisters
 2013 Genesis
 2013 Love & Lies
 2012–2013 Teen Gen
 2012–2013 Paroa: Ang Kuwento ni Mariposa
 2012 Kasalanan Bang Ibigin Ka?
 2012 Eat Bulaga! (on Saturdays)
 2011 Time of My Life
 2011 Bagets: Just Got Lucky
 2010 Ilumina
 2010 Party Pilipinas
 2009–2010 Full House
 2009 SRO Cinema Serye Suspetsa
 2009 Zorro
 2008 Codename: Asero
 2007–2008 Kamandag
 2007 Philippine Idol
 2006–2007 Atlantika
 2006 Encantadia: Pag-ibig Hanggang Wakas
 2005–2006 Etheria
 2005 Encantadia
 2004–2005 Forever in My Heart
 2004 Hanggang Kailan
 2003–2006 Love to Love
 1999–2000 Pintados
 1995-1999 T.G.I.S.

Film

as director 
 TBA Voltes V: Legacy
 2017 Trip Ubusan: The Lolas Vs. Zombies
 2011 Tween Academy: Class of 2012
 2010 You to Me Are Everything
 2010 Andong Agimat
 2008 I.T.A.L.Y.
 2008 My Bestfriend's Girlfriend
 2007 Resiklo
 2007 Tiyanaks
 2007 Angels (segment: Angel of Love)
 2006 Till I Met You
 2006 Eternity
 2006 Moments of Love
 2005 Mulawin: The Movie
 1998 Silaw
 1996 TGIS The Movie

as writer 
 2007 Resiklo (screenplay)
 2007 Tiyanaks (story)
 2006 Moments of Love (story)
 1998 Tiyanaks (written by)

Web film 
 2019 Mystified

References

External links
 

Living people
Year of birth missing (living people)
Filipino screenwriters
Filipino television directors
GMA Network (company) people
Filipino film directors
Encantadia